Hideaway is the third album released by The Weepies. It was released on April 2, 2008 by Nettwerk. The album debuted at number 31 on the US Billboard 200 chart, selling 14,000 copies in its first week.

The song "All This Beauty" was featured on the Sex and the City: Original Motion Picture Soundtrack in 2008. The song "Can't Go Back Now" was featured in the 2009 film Adam, along with the shows Life Unexpected, Pretty Little Liars, and The Fosters. The song "All Good Things" was written for Mandy Moore's 2007 album Wild Hope.

Track listing

Personnel
Deb Talan - vocals, guitar, keyboard, percussion
Steve Tannen - vocals, guitar, keyboard, percussion
Frank Lenz - drums, keyboard
Steve Walsh - guitar
Whynot Jansveld - bass, electric guitar
Meghan Toohey - electric guitar
Brad Gordon - keyboard, horns
John Delay - Keyboard
Oliver Kraus - strings

Charts

References

External links
The Weepies Official Home Page
Hideaway on Amazon.com

2008 albums
The Weepies albums